Stefanos Kollias from the National Technical University of Athens, Greece was named Fellow of the Institute of Electrical and Electronics Engineers (IEEE) in 2015 for contributions to intelligent systems for multimedia content analysis and human machine interaction.

References 

Fellow Members of the IEEE
Living people
Year of birth missing (living people)
Academic staff of the National Technical University of Athens